Harold Palin (19 August 1916 – 16 September 1990), also known by the nickname of "Moggy", was an English professional rugby league footballer who played in the 1930s, 1940s and 1950s. Harold Palin's nickname of 'Moggy' was given to him as a child due to cat-like abilities, however he was not particularly fond of the nickname.

Background
Palin was born in Warrington, Lancashire, England, and he died aged 74 in Warrington, Cheshire, England.

Playing career

International honours
Harold Palin won caps for England while at Warrington in 1947 against Wales, in 1948 against France, and won caps for Great Britain while at Warrington in 1947 against New Zealand (2 matches).

Championship final appearances
Harold Palin played , and was captain in Warrington's 15–5 victory over Bradford Northern in the Championship Final during the 1947–48 season at Maine Road, Manchester.

Challenge Cup Final appearances
Harold Palin played , scored a drop goal, and 4-goals in Warrington's 19–0 victory over Widnes in the 1949–50 Challenge Cup Final during the 1949–50 season at Wembley Stadium, London on Saturday 6 May 1950, in front of a crowd of 94,249.

County Cup Final appearances
Harold Palin played  in Swinton's 5–4 victory over Widnes in the 1939–40 Lancashire County Cup Final first-leg during the 1939–40 season at Naughton Park, Widnes on Saturday 20 April 1940, played  in the 16–11 victory over Widnes in the 1939–40 Lancashire County Cup Final second-leg during the 1939–40 season at Station Road, Swinton on Saturday 27 April 1940, played , and scored a goal in Warrington's 8–14 defeat by Wigan in the 1948–49 Lancashire County Cup Final during the 1948–49 season at Station Road, Swinton on Saturday 13 November 1948, and played , and scored a goal in Warrington's 5–28 defeat by Wigan in the 1950–51 Lancashire County Cup Final during the 1950–51 season at Station Road, Swinton on Saturday 4 November 1950.

Playing career
Harold Palin made his début for Keighley, played , and scored 4-goals in the 17–11 victory over Castleford at Wheldon Road on Saturday 27 September 1952, by the end of 1952–53 season he had beaten Keighley's 46-year-old "most goals in a season" record that was previously set by Bob Walker during the 1906–07 season, after landing his 81st conversion in the last match of the season at York, Harold Palin was later sent off by the referee, he played eight matches during the 1953–54 season, and following the arrival of Bert Cook from Leeds, Harold Palin retired from playing aged 37.

Honoured at Warrington Wolves
Harold Palin is a Warrington Wolves Hall of Fame inductee.

References

External links
(archived by web.archive.org) The Rock and Roll 50s
(archived by web.archive.org) The Club's Foundation
(archived by web.archive.org) Statistics at wolvesplayers.thisiswarrington.co.uk

1916 births
1990 deaths
England national rugby league team players
English rugby league players
Great Britain national rugby league team players
Halifax R.L.F.C. players
Keighley Cougars captains
Keighley Cougars players
Rugby league fullbacks
Rugby league locks
Rugby league players from Warrington
Swinton Lions players
Warrington Wolves captains
Warrington Wolves players